Davis House (also known as El Recuerdo) is a historic plantation house located near Manning, Clarendon County, South Carolina.

Description and history 
It was built about 1843, and is a two-story, frame vernacular Greek Revival style dwelling. It has weatherboard sheathing, a gable roof, and one-story, gabled-roofed ells at either side. The façade features a central, two-tiered portico with four pillars on each level. The house was built by Bertrand Davis, a locally known planter and militia officer.

It was listed in the National Register of Historic Places on January 13, 1983.

References

Plantation houses in South Carolina
Houses on the National Register of Historic Places in South Carolina
Greek Revival houses in South Carolina
Houses completed in 1843
Houses in Clarendon County, South Carolina
National Register of Historic Places in Clarendon County, South Carolina
1843 establishments in South Carolina